Coronilla valentina, the shrubby scorpion-vetch, scorpion vetch or bastard senna, is a species of flowering plant in the genus Coronilla of the legume family Fabaceae, native to the Mediterranean Basin, and introduced into Kenya and the United States. Linnaeus observed that the flowers, remarkably fragrant in the daytime, are almost scentless at night.

In cultivation it is fairly hardy, but prefers Mediterranean conditions, with shelter and warm sunshine. The subspecies C. valentina subsp. glauca (syn. C. glauca) and its cultivar 'Citrina' have gained the Royal Horticultural Society's Award of Garden Merit (confirmed 2017).

References

valentina
Plants described in 1753
Taxa named by Carl Linnaeus
Flora of Malta